Rhinotoides is a genus of beetles which belong to the belids.

References

Belidae